V. exigua may refer to:

 Veigaia exigua, a non-parasitic mite
 Velleia exigua, an Oceanian herb